An Otter is an aquatic or marine carnivorous mammal.

Otter may also refer to:

Places
Otter, Germany, a municipality in Lower Saxony
Otter, Ontario, Canada, a dispersed rural community
Otter, Montana, United States, an unincorporated community
Otter, Ohio, United States, an unincorporated community
River Otter, Devon, England

Vessels and vehicles
Otter (dinghy), a type of two-man sailing dinghy
Otter (steamship), a sidewheeler used by the Hudson's Bay Company in the Pacific Northwest from the 1830s
Otter (sternwheeler), 1874–1897, mainly in Puget Sound
, American sailing ship on which Thomas Muir of Huntershill escaped from an Australian convict settlement in 1796
HMS Otter, several ships of the Royal Navy
USS Otter (DE-210), a destroyer escort of the United States Navy
HMQS Otter, a patrol and examination vessel of the Queensland Maritime Defence Force, and later the Royal Australian Navy
Otter Light Reconnaissance Car, an armoured car built in Canada during the Second World War
De Havilland Canada DHC-3 Otter and De Havilland Canada DHC-6 Twin Otter aircraft
M76 Otter, an amphibious cargo carrier used by the United States Marine Corps during the Vietnam War

Sports teams
Cal State Monterey Bay Otters, the athletics teams of California State University, Monterey Bay
Evansville Otters, a Frontier League baseball team
Erie Otters, a junior hockey team in the Ontario Hockey League, based in Erie, Pennsylvania
Huntsville Otters, a junior "C" hockey team, from Huntsville, Ontario
Missouri River Otters, a minor pro team in the United Hockey League from 1999 to 2006

People
Otter (surname)
Otter or Ótr, son of Hreidmar, a dwarf in Norse mythology
Otter, a main character in the 1978 film Animal House, played by Tim Matheson
Otter (gay culture), LGBT slang similar to bear, but referring to a thinner build

Other
Otter.ai, a web application which performs voice to text transcription
Otter Browser, open-source web browser clone of Opera (web browser)
Otter (software), infrastructure automation tool
Otter (theorem prover), a public domain software program
Otter Media, a mediaconglomerate of WarnerMedia
Otter, or ottu (instrument), a drone-oboe played in Southern India
De Otter, Amsterdam, a windmill
Orthodontic Technicians Association (abbreviated as OTA and pronounced "otter")
Otter (fishing device), a floating fishing device used from boat or from land equipped with a steering mechanism

See also 
Maris Otter, brand name for pale malted barley
Ottery (disambiguation)